Emancipation Proclamation: A Real Statement of Freedom is an album by percussionist Hamid Drake and multi-instrumentalist and composer Joe McPhee recorded in 1999 and first released on the Okka Disk label.

Reception

Allmusic reviewer Thom Jurek states "Emancipation Proclamation: A Real Statement of Freedom is one of those avant jazz duet dates that puts everything else in perspective by revealing at its heart that anything is possible when conditions are right". On All About Jazz, Derek Taylor wrote "Taped at Chicago's Empty Bottle where monumental meetings of this caliber almost seem customary it's a union that many followers of creative improvised music have been dreaming about for some time".

Track listing 
All compositions by Joe McPhee and Hamid Drake except as indicated
 "Cries and Whispers" - 18:37
 "Mother Africa (For Miriam Makeba)" - 17:10
 "God Bless the Child" (Billie Holiday, Arthur Herzog Jr.) - 4:17
 "Emancipation Proclamation" - 14:30
 "Hate Crime Cries" - 3:13

Personnel 
Joe McPhee - pocket trumpet, tenor saxophone
Hamid Drake - percussion, drums

References 

Joe McPhee live albums
Hamid Drake live albums
2000 live albums
Okka Disk live albums